Sweetwater Creek is a novel by Anne Rivers Siddons. Published in 2005, it is the story of a girl named Emily who survives her mother's abandonment and her older brother's suicide. She finds purpose in training her father's spaniels and takes refuge in the magic of Sweetwater Creek. A new friend enters Emily's life in the person of Lulu, a troubled daughter of privilege whose secrets threaten to destroy Emily's beautiful new world.

Reception
Publishers Weekly wrote that it was a "capable but uninspired story of a young girl's coming-of-age on the family plantation".

References

2005 American novels